1993 Sanfrecce Hiroshima season

Review and events

League results summary

League results by round

Competitions

Domestic results

J.League

Suntory series

NICOS series

Emperor's Cup

J.League Cup

Player statistics

 † player(s) joined the team after the opening of this season.

Transfers

In:

Out:

Transfers during the season

In
Jan Jönsson
Kazuyori Mochizuki (from Sanfrecce Hiroshima GK coach)

Out
Jan Jönsson (on December)

References

Other pages
 J. League official site
 Sanfrecce Hiroshima official site

Sanfrecce Hiroshima
Sanfrecce Hiroshima seasons